Aristarchus  may refer to:

People
 Aristarchus of Tegea (5th century BC), Greek writer
 Aristarchus of Athens, (5th century BC), one of the leaders of the Athenian coup of 411 BC
 Aristarchus of Athens, though apparently different from the above, a conversation between whom and Socrates is recorded by Xenophon in his Memorabilia (2.7.)
 Aristarchus of Sparta, harmost of Byzantium in 400 BC
 Aristarchus (physician), royal physician to the court of Syria in the 3rd century BC
 Aristarchus of Samos (c. 310–230 BC), Greek astronomer and mathematician
 Aristarchus of Samothrace (c. 220–143 BC), Greek grammarian
 Aristarchus, one of the ambassadors sent by the Phocaeans to Seleucus IV Philopator, the son of Antiochus III the Great, in 190 BC
 Aristarchus of Colchis (fl. 63–50 BC), Colchian dynast, appointed by Pompey after the close of the Mithridatic Wars
 Aristarchus of Thessalonica (1st century AD), Eastern saint and early Christian mentioned in a few passages in the New Testament
 Aristarchus the Chronographer, author of a letter on the situation of Athens, and the events which took place there in the 1st century AD, and especially of the life of Dionysius the Areopagite
 Aristarchus of Alexandria (date unknown), the author of a work on the interpretation of dreams, mentioned by Artemidorus in the 2nd century

Other
 3999 Aristarchus, a main-belt asteroid
 Aristarchus (crater), on the Moon

See also
 Aristarchos 2.3 m Telescope Project